Trikut Pahar (Trikut Hill) is a Hindu pilgrimage situated around 15 km away from the town of Deoghar, on the way to Dumka at Trikut Basdiha in Mohanpur Block of Deoghar District in Jharkhand state, India. There are three main peaks on the hill (the "tri-" of Trikutachal). The height of this hill is 2470 feet. A rope way is a tourist attraction and can be used to reach the top of the hill. Other than the ropeway, tourists can also use the stairs to reach the top. The hill is covered with clouds in rainy seasons and waterfalls and small streams are visible from July–September. There are views from the top of the mountain and solar panels situated in Tapovan (First solar energy hub in Jharkhand) are also visible. Trikut is a tourist spot in Jharkhand state.

Tapovan, which is known for the temple of Taponath Mahadev and Hanuman, is at a distance of 10km from Trikut Hill. River Mayurakshi, which flows through several districts of the state of West Bengal and finally joins River Hooghly, originates from Trikut Hill.

Religious importance

Trikut Hill (त्रिकुट पर्वत) is one of the many Hindu pilgrimages located 10 km away from Deoghar. 

As per the Hindu script Ramayana, Ravana, the king of Lanka (now Sri Lanka) was the most revered devotee of Shiva. In order to impress the Lord of Destruction, the king performed intense penance for several thousand years and sung songs in praise of him. Pleased with his utter devotion and the melody of his hymns, Shiva asked him for a wish. Ravana, however, wished for the Lord to accompany him to Lanka, stunning all the other Hindu gods and goddesses. Shiva though was calm and agreed to go with him but in the form of Shiva linga and on one condition. If ever Ravana, for any reason during the journey, keeps the Shivlinga at any other place, then the lingam will be established there itself for eternity can never be uprooted ever again. The Lankeshwar giddily accepted it and began with the journey. However, in the middle of his voyage, Ravana had this sudden urge to relieve himself. His eyes fell on the Trikut Hill where he landed at the top, hence one of the points on the Trikut Hill is named as Ravana's Helipad. The perplexed King, recalling Shiva's condition, tries to search for any signs of life which could for the time being hold the lingam but failed. Lastly, he turned into a giant to have a wider view of the area and saw a young boy in the fields of Deoghar with his cattle and requested for help. The boy, who was in fact a carnation of Lord Ganesha, agreed but only on the condition of Ravana coming back to take the possession of the Linga after 3 calls. The helpless King agreed again and proceeded with his business. But since the Ganges was flowing inside him, it took longer than expected. Several hours later when Ravana came back to take back the Shivlinga, he became furious as the boy had left already with the Lingam kept on the ground. Ravana tried everything to uplift ut again but true to Shiva's words, the establishment had already been done. Exhausted and frustrated, Ravana punches on the Linga, rooting it further into the ground and leaves. That is the reason why the Deoghar Shivlinga is called as Ravaneshwar Shivlinga.

There are three peaks of the Trikut Hill named after the three Hindu Gods, Bramha, Vishnu and Shiva. Out of the three, only one peak is open for tourists.

References

External links 
 http://www.babadham.org/trikut.php

Hills of Jharkhand
Deoghar